Stylurus potulentus, the yellow-sided clubtail, is a species of dragonfly in the family Gomphidae. It is endemic to the United States.  Its natural habitat is rivers. It is threatened by habitat loss.

References

Insects of the United States
Gomphidae
Taxonomy articles created by Polbot
Insects described in 1942